Allocasuarina pinaster, commonly known as the compass bush, is a shrub of the genus Allocasuarina native to a small area in the southern Wheatbelt  region of Western Australia.

It is found in gravelly lateritic soils.

References

External links
  Occurrence data for Allocasuarina pinaster from The Australasian Virtual Herbarium

pinaster
Rosids of Western Australia
Fagales of Australia
Dioecious plants